Arthur Peel, 1st Viscount Peel (1829–1912) was a British politician, Speaker of the House of Commons.

Arthur Peel may also refer to:

 Arthur Peel, 2nd Earl Peel (1901–1969), British peer
 Sir Arthur Peel (diplomat) (1861–1952), British envoy to Thailand, Brazil and Bulgaria
 George Peel (Arthur George Villiers Peel, 1869–1956), British Member of Parliament and writer on politics and economics